"Alive", is the second official single from Alive, the third album from Belgian artist Kate Ryan, released August 14, 2006. The song was written by DJ Zki, Dobre and Victoria Horn and was produced by Philip Dirix. It was featured amongst the music on the website for Abercrombie & Fitch.

Formats and track listings
 CD Single
"Alive" - 3:31
"Alive" (French Version) - 3:31
"Nothing" - 3:28

Charts

References

2006 singles
Kate Ryan songs
Songs written by Victoria Horn
2006 songs
EMI Records singles